Olprinone (INN) is a cardiotonic agent. It has been marketed in Japan since 1996.

References

External links

Antianginals
Conjugated nitriles
Imidazopyridines
2-Pyridones